The Outpost is an American fantasy-adventure drama television series, acquired by The CW, which premiered on July 10, 2018. It was produced by Syfy's international channels for international broadcast. The series was renewed for a third season in October 2019 which premiered on October 8, 2020. Ahead of the third-season premiere, the series was picked up for an additional 13 episodes. In September 2021, the series was canceled after four seasons and concluded on October 7, 2021.

Premise
"The Outpost follows Talon, the lone survivor of a race called Blackbloods. Years after her entire village was destroyed by a gang of brutal mercenaries, Talon travels to a lawless fortress on the edge of the civilized world, as she tracks the killers of her family. On her journey to this outpost, Talon discovers she possesses an extraordinary and mysterious supernatural power that she must learn to control in order to save herself, and defend the world against a fanatical religious dictator."

Cast

Main

 Jessica Green as Talon
 Jake Stormoen as Captain Garret Spears
 Imogen Waterhouse as Lady Gwynn Calkussar/Princess Rosmund (seasons 1–3)
 Anand Desai-Barochia as Janzo
 Andrew Howard as Gate Marshal Cedric Wythers (seasons 1–2)
 Robyn Malcolm as Elinor/the Mistress (seasons 1–2)
 Kevin McNally as The Smith (season 1)
 Aaron Fontaine as Tobin (seasons 2–4)
 Glynis Barber as Gertrusha (seasons 2–3)
 Reece Ritchie as Zed (seasons 3–4; recurring season 2)
 Izuka Hoyle as Wren (seasons 3–4)
 Jaye Griffiths as Yavalla (season 3)
 Adam Johnson as Munt (seasons 3–4; recurring seasons 1–2)
 Georgia May Foote as Falista (seasons 3–4)

Recurring

 Charan Prabhakar as Danno (season 1)
 Philip Brodie as Ambassador Everit Dred (seasons 1–2)
 Thor Knai as Kell (season 1)
 Cokey Falkow as Tiberion Shek (season 1)
 Michael Flynn as General Cornelius Calkussar (season 1)
 Elizabeth Birkner as Ilyin (aka. The Dragman) (seasons 1–2)
 Sonalii Castillo as Essa Khan (seasons 1–2)
 Medalion Rahimi (season 1) and Amita Suman (season 2, 4) as Naya
 Lilli Hollunder as Rebb (season 2)
 Jelena Gavrilović as Sana (season 2)
 Andreja Maricic as One (of the Three) (season 2)
 Jelena Stupljanin as Two (of the Three) (seasons 2–4)
 Eilian Wyn-Jones as Three (of the Three) (seasons 2–4)
 Dragan Mićanović as Captain Orlick (season 2–3)
 James Downie as Sammy/Alton (seasons 2–3)
 Patrick Lyster as Captain Calkussar (season 2–3)
 Tiana Upcheva as Warlita (seasons 2–4)
 Tamara Aleksić as Liecia (season 3) and Janya (season 4)
 Nikki Leigh Scott as Vorta (seasons 3–4)
 Milos Vojnović as Tera (seasons 3–4)
 Maeve Courtier-Lilley as Luna (season 4)
 Tamara Radovanović as Nedra (season 4)
 Pavle Jerinić as 313/Marvyn (season 4)
 Jovana Miletić as Levare (season 4)
 Srdjan Timarov as Kultor (season 4)
 Jovan Jovanović as Golu (season 4)
 Gerard Miller as Aster (season 4)

Episodes

Series overview

Season 1 (2018)

Season 2 (2019)

Season 3 (2020–21)

Season 4 (2021)

Production and broadcast
Syfy International greenlit the series for a 10-episode first season on January 16, 2018. On March 7, 2018, The CW picked up the series for broadcast in the United States. It was filmed in Utah between January and May 2018.

In October 2018, The CW renewed The Outpost for a second season, which premiered on July 11, 2019. Production on the second season began in January 2019, with production on the series moving to Serbia. The CW renewed the series for a third season in October 2019 which premiered on October 8, 2020. In March 2020, Stormoen announced that production of The Outpost had been shut down during the filming of the sixth and seventh episodes of the season due to the COVID-19 pandemic. On June 8, 2020, it was reported production was set to resume filming for the third season in Serbia on June 12, 2020.

On October 7, 2020, ahead of the third-season premiere, The CW picked up an additional 13 episodes of the series. In May 2021, it was reported that The Outpost would return to airing on The CW on July 15, 2021. On September 15, 2021, The CW canceled the series after four seasons, and it concluded on October 7, 2021.

Home media
The first season was released on DVD from Electric Entertainment on August 6, 2019. The second season was released on DVD from Electric Entertainment on September 15, 2020.

Reception

Critical response

The review aggregation website Rotten Tomatoes reports a score of 50% for the series, with an average rating of 4.67/10, based on 10 reviews. The website's critical consensus reads, "A featherweight fantasy with a few enticing features, The Outpost potential pleasures can't quite overcome its cheap-looking production design." On Metacritic, the series holds a score of 39 out of 100, based on 5 critics, indicating "generally unfavorable reviews".

In his review of the premiere, Daniel Fienberg of The Hollywood Reporter considered the series looked "cheap" for a broadcast network series, adding that, "Way too much of the pilot for The Outpost is people talking around the things the budget can't show." CBR's Josh Bell similarly criticized the series' production values, but also its use of fantasy "clichés and contrivances" in the pilot episode. Several critics compared The Outpost unfavorably to other fantasy series, including Game of Thrones, Lord of the Rings, and Xena: Warrior Princess.

Ratings

Season 1

Season 2

Season 3

Season 4

Awards and nominations

Notes

References

External links
 

2010s American drama television series
2020s American drama television series
2018 American television series debuts
2021 American television series endings
American adventure television series
American fantasy drama television series
American fantasy television series
English-language television shows
Television shows filmed in Utah
The CW original programming
Television shows filmed in Serbia